Sir Ralph Delaval, 1st Baronet (13 October 1622 – 29 August 1691) of Seaton Delaval, Northumberland was an English landowner and politician who sat in the House of Commons at various times between 1659 and 1685.

Delaval was the son of Robert Delaval of Seaton Delaval. He matriculated at Queen's College, Oxford on 15 June 1638, aged 16 and was admitted to Lincoln's Inn in 1639. He was High Sheriff of Northumberland in 1649.

In 1659, Delaval was elected Member of Parliament for Northumberland for the Third Protectorate Parliament. He was re-elected MP for Northumberland in 1660 for the Convention Parliament. He was created a baronet of Seaton, in the County of Northumberland in the Baronetage of England on 29 June 1660. In 1677 he was elected MP for Northumberland again in the Cavalier Parliament and was re-elected for the two parliaments of 1679 and in 1681.

Delaval developed the family's commercial interests at Seaton Delaval by building a harbour and sluice gates at nearby Hartley Pans, which came to be known as Seaton Sluice.

Delaval was succeeded firstly by his eldest son Ralph and later by a younger son John.

References

1622 births
1691 deaths
Alumni of The Queen's College, Oxford
Baronets in the Baronetage of England
English barristers
English landowners
High Sheriffs of Northumberland
English MPs 1659
English MPs 1660
English MPs 1661–1679
English MPs 1679
English MPs 1680–1681
English MPs 1681